Baghcheh Ghaz may refer to:
 Baghcheh Ghaz, Hamadan
 Baghcheh Ghaz, Markazi